Stuckey is a town in Williamsburg County, South Carolina, United States. The population was 245 at the 2010 census.

Geography
Stuckey is located at  (33.729688, -79.512840).

According to the United States Census Bureau, the town has a total area of 0.9 square miles (2.4 km2), all of it land.

Demographics

As of the census of 2000, there were 263 people, 100 households, and 72 families residing in the town. The population density was 287.7 people per square mile (111.6/km2). There were 113 housing units at an average density of 123.6 per square mile (47.9/km2). The racial makeup of the town was 17.11% White, 79.47% African American, 1.90% Asian, 0.76% from other races, and 0.76% from two or more races. Hispanic or Latino of any race were 0.76% of the population.

There were 100 households, out of which 34.0% had children under the age of 18 living with them, 49.0% were married couples living together, 18.0% had a female householder with no husband present, and 28.0% were non-families. 27.0% of all households were made up of individuals, and 12.0% had someone living alone who was 65 years of age or older. The average household size was 2.63 and the average family size was 3.19.

In the town, the population was spread out, with 27.4% under the age of 18, 5.3% from 18 to 24, 24.7% from 25 to 44, 28.5% from 45 to 64, and 14.1% who were 65 years of age or older. The median age was 40 years. For every 100 females, there were 78.9 males. For every 100 females age 18 and over, there were 78.5 males.

The median income for a household in the town was $26,250, and the median income for a family was $36,250. Males had a median income of $27,083 versus $20,469 for females. The per capita income for the town was $13,058. About 13.1% of families and 16.7% of the population were below the poverty line, including 22.3% of those under the age of eighteen and 20.0% of those 65 or over.

References

External links
Information about Stuckey from Williamsburg County

Towns in Williamsburg County, South Carolina
Towns in South Carolina